His Wife's Mistakes is a 1916 American short comedy film directed by and starring Fatty Arbuckle.

Cast
 Roscoe Arbuckle 
 Minta Durfee
 Joe Bordeaux
 Arthur Earle - Percy Dovewing
 Betty Gray
 William Jefferson
 Alfred St. John

See also
Fatty Arbuckle filmography

References

External links

1916 films
Films directed by Roscoe Arbuckle
1916 comedy films
1916 short films
American silent short films
American black-and-white films
Silent American comedy films
American comedy short films
1910s American films